

External links
Official website

Off-Broadway musicals

DRUMLine Live is a theatrical production created by Don P. Roberts, the Executive Band Consultant of the 2002 hit movie, Drumline and Drumline: A New Beat.  DRUMLine Live traces the heritage of the Historically Black College and University HBCU marching band, concentrating primarily on the brass and percussion instruments along with the use of "auxiliary" ...high energy dancing and stepping to interpret the music visually. Dramatic lighting, intricate choreography, exciting costumes and stage effects enhance the show theatrically.

DRUMLine Live, the show stopping attraction has paraded into some of the most renown theatre stages in America, Japan, and Korea, and performed hundreds of shows since 2009. The legendary Historically Black College and University (HBCU) band experience comes alive with this world-class cast of percussionists, musicians and dancers. DRUMLine Live is a high-octane musical roller coaster ride that is guaranteed to touch every emotion in your body. With riveting rhythms, bold beats, and ear-grabbing energy, DRUMLine Live is a synchronized musical showcase of the legendary HBCU experience that also features various genres of music from Hip-Hop, American Soul, Gospel, Jazz, and more. DRUMLine Live brings a unique style of drumming, mesmerizing musicianship, and energetic choreography NEVER seen on stage before. The show is composed of a 35-40 person crew, including trained musicians, dancers, singers and actors.